Veer Bahadur Singh Sports College, Gorakhpur is a residential sports college in Gorakhpur, Uttar Pradesh, established in 1988. It offers sports training in football, hockey, wrestling, athletics, badminton, swimming and kabaddi in 6th to 12th standard and with the curriculum of the U.P. Board. It is the second sports college established in Uttar Pradesh after Guru Gobind Singh Sports College of Lucknow and before Etawah's Saifai Sports College.

History

After the success of Guru Gobind Singh Sports College, Lucknow, the government of Uttar Pradesh established this sports college in Gorakhpur in 1988–1989.

Notable alumni
 Preeti Dubey, Indian Women's Hockey team (2016 Summer Olympics)

See also
Maharana Pratap Sports College, Dehradun
Motilal Nehru School of Sports, Rai, Sonipat

External links
Official website

References

Sport schools in India
Intermediate colleges in Uttar Pradesh
Universities and colleges in Uttar Pradesh
Sport in Gorakhpur
Education in Gorakhpur
Uttar Pradesh Sports Colleges Society
1988 establishments in Uttar Pradesh
Educational institutions established in 1988